Robotniczy Klub Sportowy „Skała" ('Workers Sport Club "Rock"', abbreviated RKS) was a Jewish Communist sports organization in Wyszków, Poland, active during the interbellum years. Founded in 1928, RKS was one of two Jewish sports organizations in the city (the other being Makabi). The club had a football team.

RKS had initially appealed to Jewish workers across party lines, with the slogan that "...if you are a worker, you belong in this club". However, the political unity became short-lived. The communists seized control over the club. Just a few weeks after its foundation, the Poale Zion Left followers split away and set up a third Jewish sports organization in the city (Gwiazda).

RKS had more than 200 members (100 men, 70 women and 40 children). Its members were largely from the Jewish Section of the Communist Party. However, there were also some unaffiliated workers that remained as members of the club.

References

Sports organisations of Poland
Jewish sports organizations
Defunct football clubs in Poland
1928 establishments in Poland
Jewish football clubs
Jewish Polish history
Communism in Poland
Communist Party of Poland
Communist sports organizations
Socialist organisations in Poland